Aakhir Kyon? is a 1985 Indian Hindi-language film produced and directed by J. Om Prakash. It stars Rajesh Khanna, Smita Patil, Rakesh Roshan and Tina Munim. The movie was declared a hit on its release.

Plot

Nisha (Smita Patil) is an orphaned child who has been adopted by her relatives and raised alongside her cousin, Indu (Tina Munim). As both cousins enter their 20s, Indu falls in love with the rich and good-looking Kabir (Rakesh Roshan). However, Kabir takes a liking to Nisha and to the dismay of Indu, marries Nisha, wanting an obedient and socially conservative wife moulding to the traditional norms as Nisha constrained to, compared to Indu, who was liberal and progressive in her views and behaviour. After marriage, all seems well in the life of Nisha and Kabir and soon, Nisha becomes pregnant. Meanwhile, a happy Nisha is oblivious to Kabir's affairs and dalliances with several women, on the pretext of business trips.

Nisha's pregnancy is deemed as a complication by her doctor and upon the insistence of Indu's mother (Shubha Khote), Indu moves into Nisha and Kabir's home to take care of her. As Nisha becomes restricted in her daily activities, Indu gets closer to Kabir and engages in an extramarital affair with him, reviving her erstwhile attraction to him. Oblivious to these new changes, Nisha continues with her life and eventually delivers a girl. Upon return and realising the affair between her husband and cousin, she is shattered and confronts Kabir and Indu. Kabir resists and refuses to end his affair and asks her to adjust to this change. Nisha refuses and leaves the house, handing her daughter's responsibilities to their house maid.

In the new male-dominated world, Nisha struggles and meets with Alok (Rajesh Khanna). They quickly become friends and Alok develops feelings towards Nisha; but Nisha remains focused on her work and succeeds as an author detailing her life struggles and the fight against it. On the other side, the relationship between Kabir and Indu remains stagnant, with their financial situation worsening and circumstances making them realise their mistakes.

As Nisha and Kabir's daughter becomes of marriageable age, a worried Kabir is unsure how he would afford such an alliance, but Nisha comes and rescues Kabir by selling him her publishing rights henceforth and forwarding the royalties to her marriage and life. Kabir apologises for whatever happened and repents deeply, leaving Nisha to comment that she has moved on from her life and does not want her daughter to know her identity and the pain she might endure knowing her mother's fate. As their daughter is married, Alok meets with Nisha and tells her that its time for them to officiate their relation. As Nisha resists, still moulding to her traditional values, Alok confronts with a question "Akhir Kyon?" (Why So?) explaining that when she was going through marital troubles, society blamed her and refused to support her, so why worry about society. Hence, "Why So?". Alok applies sindoor and officiates his relationship with her.

Cast
 Rajesh Khanna as Aloknath
 Smita Patil as Nisha Suri
 Rakesh Roshan as Kabir Suri
 Tina Munim as Indu Sharma
 Asrani as Radha Raman Goswami
 Sujit Kumar as Mr. S. Kumar
 Shobha Khote as Indu's Mother
 Beena Banerjee as Abha

Soundtrack
The movie had good soundtrack and many memorable songs composed by Rajesh Roshan.

References

External links

1980s Hindi-language films
1985 films
1985 romantic drama films
Indian romantic drama films
Films scored by Rajesh Roshan
Films directed by J. Om Prakash
Hindi-language drama films